Oscar Tuero (December 17, 1898 – October 21, 1960) was a professional baseball player. He was a right-handed pitcher over parts of three seasons (1918–1920) with the St. Louis Cardinals. For his career, he compiled a 6–9 record in 58 appearances, mostly as a relief pitcher, with a 2.88 earned run average and 58 strikeouts.

Tuero was born in Havana, Cuba and died in Houston, Texas at the age of 61.

See also
 List of Major League Baseball annual saves leaders

References

1898 births
1960 deaths
Major League Baseball pitchers
Major League Baseball players from Cuba
Cuban expatriate baseball players in the United States
St. Louis Cardinals players
Jersey City Skeeters players
Portland Duffs players
Lewiston Cupids players
Lynn Pipers players
Wilkes-Barre Barons (baseball) players
Binghamton Bingoes players
Little Rock Travelers players
Memphis Chickasaws players
Kansas City Blues (baseball) players
Atlanta Crackers players
Reading Keystones players
Birmingham Barons players
Waco Cubs players
Shreveport Sports players
Jackson Senators players
Tyler Sports players
Tyler Governors players
Marshall Orphans players
Marshall Tigers players
Newton-Conover Twins players
Alexandria Aces players
Longview Cannibals players
Midland Cowboys players
Clarksdale Ginners players
Baseball players from Havana